Cowichan-Newcastle was a provincial electoral district in the Canadian province of British Columbia.  It appeared in two separate eras, the later in the British Columbia elections of  1960 and 1963 elections.

Demographics

Political geography

Notable elections

First Nations

Notable MLAs

Electoral history 

Note: Winners in each election are in bold.

|-

|Canadian Labour Party (B.C. Section)
|Samuel Guthrie
|align="right"|1,132 			
|align="right"|28.40%
|align="right"|
|align="right"|unknown

|Liberal
|Wymond Wolverton Walkem 	
|align="right"|738 			
|align="right"|18.51%
|align="right"|
|align="right"|unknown
|- bgcolor="white"
!align="right" colspan=3|Total valid votes
!align="right"|3,986 	
!align="right"|100.00%
!align="right"|
|- bgcolor="white"
!align="right" colspan=3|Total rejected ballots
!align="right"|
!align="right"|
!align="right"|
|- bgcolor="white"
!align="right" colspan=3|Turnout
!align="right"|%
!align="right"|
!align="right"|
|}

|-

|Independent
|St. George Gray
|align="right"|90 	 	 	
|align="right"|2.22%
|align="right"|
|align="right"|unknown

|Independent Labour Party
|Samuel Guthrie
|align="right"|1,607 		
|align="right"|39.61%
|align="right"|
|align="right"|unknown
|- bgcolor="white"
!align="right" colspan=3|Total valid votes
!align="right"|4,057 	
!align="right"|100.00%
!align="right"|
|- bgcolor="white"
!align="right" colspan=3|Total rejected ballots
!align="right"|108
!align="right"|
!align="right"|
|- bgcolor="white"
!align="right" colspan=3|Turnout
!align="right"|%
!align="right"|
!align="right"|
|}
  	  	  	 

|-

|Liberal
|Arnold Christmas Flett
|align="right"|1,224 		
|align="right"|26.35%
|align="right"|
|align="right"|unknown

|Co-operative Commonwealth Fed.
|Samuel Guthrie
|align="right"|1,560 	
|align="right"|33.58%
|align="right"|
|align="right"|unknown

|Independent
|Hugh George Egioke Savage
|align="right"|1,222 		
|align="right"|26.31%
|align="right"|
|align="right"|unknown
|- bgcolor="white"
!align="right" colspan=3|Total valid votes
!align="right"|4,645
!align="right"|100.00%
!align="right"|
|- bgcolor="white"
!align="right" colspan=3|Total rejected ballots
!align="right"|42
!align="right"|
!align="right"|
|- bgcolor="white"
!align="right" colspan=3|Turnout
!align="right"|%
!align="right"|
!align="right"|
|}

|-

|Liberal
|Arnold Christmas Flett
|align="right"|1,739 	
|align="right"|29.78	
|align="right"|
|align="right"|unknown

|Co-operative Commonwealth Fed.
|Samuel Guthrie
|align="right"|2,757
|align="right"|47.22%
|align="right"|
|align="right"|unknown

|- bgcolor="white"
!align="right" colspan=3|Total valid votes
!align="right"|5,839
!align="right"|100.00%
!align="right"|
|- bgcolor="white"
!align="right" colspan=3|Total rejected ballots
!align="right"|61
!align="right"|
!align="right"|
|- bgcolor="white"
!align="right" colspan=3|Turnout
!align="right"|%
!align="right"|
!align="right"|
|}

|-

|Co-operative Commonwealth Fed.
|Samuel Guthrie
|align="right"|3,768
|align="right"|55.33%
|align="right"|
|align="right"|unknown

|- bgcolor="white"
!align="right" colspan=3|Total valid votes
!align="right"|6,810 
!align="right"|100.00%
!align="right"|
|- bgcolor="white"
!align="right" colspan=3|Total rejected ballots
!align="right"|68
!align="right"|
!align="right"|
|- bgcolor="white"
!align="right" colspan=3|Turnout
!align="right"|%
!align="right"|
!align="right"|
|}

|-

|Independents
|Thomas James Boyles
|align="right"|60 		 	 	
|align="right"|0.61%
|align="right"|
|align="right"|unknown

|Co-operative Commonwealth Fed.
|Samuel Guthrie
|align="right"|4,194 			 	 	
|align="right"|42.81%
|align="right"|
|align="right"|unknown

|- bgcolor="white"
!align="right" colspan=3|Total valid votes
!align="right"|9,797 
!align="right"|100.00%
!align="right"|
|- bgcolor="white"
!align="right" colspan=3|Total rejected ballots
!align="right"|217
!align="right"|
!align="right"|
|- bgcolor="white"
!align="right" colspan=3|Turnout
!align="right"|%
!align="right"|
!align="right"|
|}

|-

|Co-operative Commonwealth Fed.
|Robert Martin Strachan
|align="right"|4,636
|align="right"|43.34%
|align="right"|5,697
|align="right"|58.36%
|align="right"|
|align="right"|unknown

|Liberal
|Andrew Mowatt Whisker
|align="right"|2,711      			 	
|align="right"|25.35%
|align="right"|4,064
|align="right"|41.64%
|align="right"|
|align="right"|unknown

|- bgcolor="white"
!align="right" colspan=3|Total valid votes
!align="right"|10,696     
!align="right"|100.00%
!align="right"|9,761 
|align="right"|
|align="right"|
|- bgcolor="white"
!align="right" colspan=3|Total rejected ballots
!align="right"|334
!align="right"|
!align="right"|
|align="right"|
|align="right"|
|- bgcolor="white"
!align="right" colspan=3|Turnout
!align="right"|%
!align="right"|
!align="right"|
|align="right"|
|align="right"|
|- bgcolor="white"
!align="right" colspan=9|1  Preferential ballot.  First and final counts shown only, of three (3).
|}  	  	  	  	  	

|-

|Independent
|William Hindle Bryant
|align="right"|118 	  			 	
|align="right"|1.14%
|align="right"|
|align="right"|
|align="right"|
|align="right"|unknown

|Progressive Conservative
|Earl Grey English
|align="right"|510 	 	  			 	 	
|align="right"|4.94%
|align="right"|
|align="right"|
|align="right"|
|align="right"|unknown

|Co-operative Commonwealth Fed.
|Robert Martin Strachan
|align="right"|4,517
|align="right"|43.73%
|align="right"|5,345
|align="right"|57.95%
|align="right"|
|align="right"|unknown

|Liberal
|Andrew Mowatt Whisker
|align="right"|2,330 	     			 	
|align="right"|22.56%
|align="right"|-
|align="right"| - %
|align="right"|
|align="right"|unknown
|- bgcolor="white"
!align="right" colspan=3|Total valid votes
!align="right"|10,329 	  	 	    
!align="right"|100.00%
!align="right"|9,223 
|align="right"|
|align="right"|
|- bgcolor="white"
!align="right" colspan=3|Total rejected ballots
!align="right"|500
!align="right"|
!align="right"|
|align="right"|
|align="right"|
|- bgcolor="white"
!align="right" colspan=3|Turnout
!align="right"|%
!align="right"|
!align="right"|
|align="right"|
|align="right"|
|- bgcolor="white"
!align="right" colspan=9|2  Preferential ballot.  First and final counts shown only, of five (5).
|}
  	  	  	  	 

|-

|Liberal
|Robert James Harvey
|align="right"|1,611 	
|align="right"|16.44%
|align="right"|
|align="right"|unknown

|Co-operative Commonwealth Fed.
|Robert Martin Strachan
|align="right"|5,015
|align="right"|51.18%
|align="right"|
|align="right"|unknown
|- bgcolor="white"
!align="right" colspan=3|Total valid votes
!align="right"| 9,799  	
!align="right"|100.00%
!align="right"|
|- bgcolor="white"
!align="right" colspan=3|Total rejected ballots
!align="right"|91
!align="right"|
!align="right"|
|- bgcolor="white"
!align="right" colspan=3|Turnout
!align="right"|%
!align="right"|
!align="right"|
|}

|-

|Progressive Conservative
|John Joseph Kerrone
|align="right"|1,206 	
|align="right"|11.30%
|align="right"|
|align="right"|unknown

|Co-operative Commonwealth Fed.
|Robert Martin Strachan
|align="right"|6,261
|align="right"|58.68%
|align="right"|
|align="right"|unknown
|- bgcolor="white"
!align="right" colspan=3|Total valid votes
!align="right"|10,670 	
!align="right"|100.00%
!align="right"|
|- bgcolor="white"
!align="right" colspan=3|Total rejected ballots
!align="right"|115
!align="right"|
!align="right"|
|- bgcolor="white"
!align="right" colspan=3|Turnout
!align="right"|66.77%
!align="right"|
!align="right"|
|}

|-

|Progressive Conservative
|Cyril Craig
|align="right"|840 	
|align="right"|7.82%
|align="right"|
|align="right"|unknown

|New Democrat
|Robert Martin Strachan
|align="right"|5,422
|align="right"|50.47%
|align="right"|
|align="right"|unknown

|Liberal
|George Wilfrid Whittaker
|align="right"|904 	
|align="right"|8.42%
|align="right"|
|align="right"|unknown
|- bgcolor="white"
!align="right" colspan=3|Total valid votes
!align="right"|10,742
!align="right"|100.00%
!align="right"|
|- bgcolor="white"
!align="right" colspan=3|Total rejected ballots
!align="right"|92
!align="right"|
!align="right"|
|- bgcolor="white"
!align="right" colspan=3|Turnout
!align="right"|%
!align="right"|
!align="right"|
|}

After the 1963 election, Cowichan-Newcastle was redistributed.  It was absorbed into the Cowichan-Malahat and Nanaimo ridings.

Sources

Elections BC website - historical election data

Former provincial electoral districts of British Columbia on Vancouver Island